3073 Kursk, provisionally known as , is a stony Florian asteroid and synchronous binary system from the inner regions of the asteroid belt, approximately 4.7 kilometers in diameter. It was discovered on 24 September 1979, by Soviet astronomer Nikolai Chernykh at the Crimean Astrophysical Observatory in Nauchnyj, on the Crimean peninsula.

Orbit and characterization 

Kursk is a member of the Flora family, one of the largest families of stony S-type asteroid in the main belt. It orbits the Sun in the inner main-belt at a distance of 1.9–2.5 AU once every 3 years and 4 months (1,227 days). Its orbit has an eccentricity of 0.14 and an inclination of 5° with respect to the ecliptic.

The Collaborative Asteroid Lightcurve Link assumes an albedo of 0.24 – derived from 8 Flora, a S-type asteroid and the family's largest member and namesake – and derives a diameter of 4.67 kilometers with an absolute magnitude of 13.86.

Satellite 

A 1.67 kilometer-large minor-planet moon, designated  was discovered orbiting Kursk in 44.96 hours (or 1 day, 20 hours, and 57 minutes).

Naming 

This minor planet was named after the old Russian city Kursk. The approved naming citation was published by the Minor Planet Center on 2 July 1985.

References

External links 
 Asteroids with Satellites, Robert Johnston, johnstonsarchive.net
 Asteroid Lightcurve Database (LCDB), query form (info )
 Dictionary of Minor Planet Names, Google books
 Asteroids and comets rotation curves, CdR – Observatoire de Genève, Raoul Behrend
 Discovery Circumstances: Numbered Minor Planets (1)-(5000) – Minor Planet Center
 
 

003073
Discoveries by Nikolai Chernykh
Named minor planets
003073
19790924